Abdul Malik (born 11 March 1998) is an Afghan cricketer. He made his international debut for the Afghanistan cricket team in March 2021.

He made his first-class debut for Amo Region in the 2017–18 Ahmad Shah Abdali 4-day Tournament on 26 October 2017. He made his List A debut for Amo Region in the 2019 Ghazi Amanullah Khan Regional One Day Tournament on 10 September 2019. He made his Twenty20 debut on 13 October 2019, for Kabul Eagles in the 2019 Shpageeza Cricket League.

In November 2019, he was named in Afghanistan's squad for the 2019 ACC Emerging Teams Asia Cup in Bangladesh. In February 2021, he was named in Afghanistan's Test squad for their series against Zimbabwe. He made his Test debut for Afghanistan, against Zimbabwe, on 2 March 2021. However, he became the first batsman for Afghanistan to be dismissed for a pair in Test cricket.

References

External links
 

1998 births
Living people
Afghan cricketers
Afghanistan Test cricketers
Amo Sharks cricketers
Place of birth missing (living people)